There You Have It may refer to:
 "There You Have It" (song), a 1998 song by Blackhawk
 There You Have It (album), a 2017 album by Reason